WVMP (101.5 FM) is a commercial radio station licensed to Vinton, Virginia, and serving the Roanoke metropolitan area.  WVMP is owned by Todd P. Robinson's WVJT, LLC.  It broadcasts a Christian talk and teaching radio format, with some programming provided by the Salem Radio Network.  National religious leaders heard on WVMP include Greg Laurie, David Jeremiah, John MacArthur, Alistair Begg and Chuck Swindoll 

WVMP has an effective radiated power (ERP) of 1,200 watts.  The transmitter is on Mill Mountain in Roanoke, off Prospect Road SE.

History

WZZI
It was owned by H. Edward Hale's Carousel Entertainment, using the call sign WZZI. It originally played country music. The station flipped to a modern rock format in January 1999.

Roanoke residents Karen and Robert Travis purchased WZZI in January 2000.  They had just purchased WRVX (97.9 FM) in Lynchburg, Virginia, which they renamed to WZZU. Formats under the Travises included alternative rock "Z101" and oldies "Oldies 101.5".

Oldies and Classic Rock
In 2004, Centennial Broadcasting bought the two stations. WZZI began simulcasting WZZU.  The two stations played oldies.  They called themselves "BOB FM" from 2004 to 2006.  They switched to classic rock as "The Planet" from 2006 to 2009.  WZZU continues airing a mainstream rock format on 97.9 FM. 

In July 2008, Washington Redskins owner Daniel Snyder announced a purchase of Centennial's four-station Roanoke-Lynchburg cluster by his Red Zebra Broadcasting.  The sale fell through and no paperwork was ever filed with the Federal Communications Commission.

Adult Album Alternative
Centennial instituted a locally focused adult album alternative (AAA) format on October 12, 2009, branded "101.5 The Valley's Music Place" WVMP.

WZZI/WVMP was the Roanoke network affiliate for the Virginia Cavaliers football and basketball broadcasts from 2007 through 2012.  The Cavaliers moved back to longtime home WFIR at the beginning of the 2012 football season, as the university preferred to partner with a news-talk station.  WZZU, which joined as Lynchburg's affiliate at the same time, remains affiliated with the network.

Centennial placed WVMP on the market in 2010. Ed Walker's Cityworks Community Broadcasting purchased the station to preserve the AAA format. Walker sold to Dr. William E. "Eddie" Amos' Community Media Group in 2014.

Changes in ownership
Todd Robinson, owner of several full-powered stations in the Roanoke/Lynchburg/Bedford market, began operating WVMP by local marketing agreement (LMA) on August 1, 2016, and announced intentions to purchase the station from Community Media Group on August 3 for $600,000. Dr. Amos cited the decreasing amount of time he had to devote to the station, but was to become a minority shareholder in Robinson's WVJT, LLC. No changes to format or branding came with the agreement. WVJT withdrew the application to transfer control on October 19, and Community Media Group resumed operating the station.

WVMP began simulcasting on separately-owned WBZS on December 1, 2016, to better cover the southwestern Roanoke area, Christiansburg and Blacksburg. WVMP's main transmitter on Mill Mountain is heavily shielded to the south and west by mountains. In January 2017, the two stations rebranded as "101.5 and 102.5 The Mountain".

Todd Robinson made a second attempt to acquire the station by purchasing Community Media Group itself for $250,000 on October 20, 2017. The sale was granted on December 1, 2017.

On February 1, 2018, the AAA format moved to WBZS alone and WVMP switched to a simulcast of oldies-formatted WHTU (103.9 FM, Big Island) and WZZI (106.9 FM, Bedford) as "Oldies 101.5".

WVMP returned to AAA "The Mountain" on December 1, 2019, as the three-year local marketing agreement with WBZS expired.

Christian radio
On November 30, 2022, at midnight, WVMP's adult album alternative format ended on the 101.5 FM signal and went online-only. On December 2, 2022, Truth Broadcasting began operating the station and flipped it to Christian talk and teaching as "The Truth".

WVMP began airing brokered programming from national religious leaders.  It also affiliated with the Salem Radio Network, which provides news and programming to a large number of Christian radio stations.

References

External links

1995 establishments in Virginia
Radio stations established in 1995
VMP